Herluf Nygaard (1 October 1916 – 3 December 2001) was a Norwegian military officer. He was born in Lurøy. He graduated from the Norwegian Military Academy in 1946. He was promoted to Colonel in 1965, and Major General in 1968. He served as General Inspector for the Home Guard from 1967. He was decorated Commander of the Order of St. Olav in 1971.

Nygaard was an active resistance fighter during the Second World War. His war decorations include the Norwegian St. Olav's Medal With Two Oak Branches and the British King's Commendation for Brave Conduct.

References

1916 births
2001 deaths
People from Helgeland
Norwegian Army personnel of World War II
Norwegian Military Academy alumni
Norwegian Army generals
Recipients of the St. Olav's Medal
Recipients of the Queen's Commendation for Brave Conduct